The maroon-belted chat-tyrant (Ochthoeca  thoracica), also known as the maroon-chested chat-tyrant or the chestnut-belted chat-tyrant, is a species of bird in the tyrant flycatcher family.  It is found in northern South America.  Its natural habitats are subtropical or tropical moist montane forests and heavily degraded former forest.

Taxonomy
This bird was considered to be a subspecies of the slaty-backed chat-tyrant (Ochthoeca cinnamomeiventris).

References

Updates to Birds of the World: A Checklist by James F. Clements. Fifth Edition. 2000.
García-Moreno, Jaime, Peter Arctander and Jon Fjeldså. 1998. Pre-Pleistocene Differentiation Among Chat-Tyrants. The Condor 100:629-640

Ochthoeca